John George Dryden (16 September 1919 – 3 April 2004) was an English professional footballer who played in the Football League for Leyton Orient and Swindon Town as an outside right. He later scouted for Burnley.

Personal life 
Dryden served in the British Armed Forces during the Second World War.

Career statistics

References 

Clapton Orient F.C. wartime guest players
English Football League players
English footballers
Association football outside forwards
1919 births
2004 deaths
Footballers from Sunderland
Charlton Athletic F.C. players
Hylton Colliery Welfare F.C. players
Swindon Town F.C. players
Leyton Orient F.C. players
Tonbridge Angels F.C. players
Snowdown Colliery Welfare F.C. players
Margate F.C. players
Sittingbourne F.C. players
Burnley F.C. non-playing staff
Plymouth Argyle F.C. wartime guest players
British military personnel of World War II